This is a list of schools located in Kedah, Malaysia. It is categorised according to the variants of schools in Malaysia, and is arranged alphabetically.

Chinese Independent High School
Sin Min High School (Sungai Petani) 
Sin Min High School (Alor Setar)
Keat Hwa High School

Islamic religious schools

Primary education: Sekolah Rendah Agama (SRA) 
 SRA Islah
 SR Islam Darul Aman (SRIDA)
 SR Islam Alor Star

Secondary education: Sekolah Menengah Kebangsaan Agama (SMKA) 
National Islamic school (Islamic secondary school)
 SMKA Baling
 SMKA Kedah
 SMKA Sik
 SMKA Yan

Private Islamic school
 SMA Al-Islah
 SMA (A) Yayasan Khairiah
 SMA Darusaadah
 SMA Daris
 SMA An-Nahdzah (Bukit Besar)
 SMA Fauzi
 SMA Pekan Gurun
 SMA Sungai Petani

State Islamic school
 Maktab Mahmud Alor Setar
 Maktab Mahmud Kuala Muda
 Maktab Mahmud Yan
 Maktab Mahmud Langkawi
 Maktab Mahmud Pokok Sena
 Maktab Mahmud Merbok
 Maktab Mahmud Baling
 Maktab Mahmud Kulim

National schools

Primary education: Sekolah Kebangsaan (SK) 
 SK Alor Setar
 SK Batu Hampar
 SK Titi Gajah
 SK Taman Aman
 SK (Felda) Bukit Tangga
 SK Tuan Syed Jan Al-Jaffri
 SK Sungai Pasir Kechil
 SK Bandar Baru Darul Aman, Jitra
 SK Bendang Raja, Alor Setar
 SK Convent Father Barre, Sungai Petani (cluster school)
 SK Dato Wan Kemara, Changlun
 SK Dato' Shaari, Alor Star
 SK Ibrahim, Sungai Petani
 SK Iskandar
 SK Jalan Paya Besar
 SK Jitra
 SK Kepala Batas
 SK Kodiang
 SK Kota Kuala Muda
 SK Kuala Ketil
 SK Kuala Teriang
 SK Kulim
 SK Labu Besar
 SK Lahar Budi
 SK Lunas Jaya
 SK Ulu Tawar
 SK Nyior Chabang
 SK Peremba
 SK Pendang
 SK Seberang Perak Baru
 SK Tembak
 SK Seri Banai
 SK Seri Negmerekari
 SK Seri Perdana
 SK Sidam Kiri
 SK Simpang Tiga
 SK Sg. Seluang, Kulim
 SK Sg. Ular, Kulim
 SK Alor Mengkudu
 SK Simpor
 SK Sri Jerai
 SK St. Nicholas Convent
 SK St. Theresa, Sungai Petani
 SK Suka Menanti
 SK Sultan Ahmad Tajuddin, Jitra (cluster school)
 SK Sultanah Asma
 SK Tunku Ismail
 SK Sungai Lalang
 SK Sungai Layar
 SK Sungai Petani
 SK Sungai Siput, Pendang
 SK Taman Hi-Tech
 SK Taman Ria
 SK Taman Rakyat
 SK Tikam Batu
 SK Ulu Melaka
 SK Yan Kechil
 SK Taman Selasih
 SK Tualang
 SK Tunku Abdul Malik
 SK Tunku Bendahara
 SK Keladi
 SK Taman Jelutong
 SK Taman Uda (Sekolah Cemerlang 2008-2011)
 SK Bukit Kechil
 SK Dulang
 SK Bukit Besar
 SK Sungai Karangan
 SK Pantai Prai
 SK Paya Kemunting
 SK Laguna Merbok
 SK Teluk Wang
 SK Teroi

Secondary education: Sekolah Menengah Kebangsaan (SMK)

Chinese Type Primary and Secondary School

Chinese Primary School

SJK (C) AIK CHEE
SJK (C) AIK MIN
SJK (C) BOON HWA
SJK (C) BOON TEIK
SJK (C) CHEE NAN
SJK (C) CHENG YU
SJK (C) CHEONG CHEN
SJK (C) CHIN HWA
SJK (C) CHING CHONG
SJK (C) CHIO MIN (A)
SJK (C) CHIO MIN (B)
SJK (C) CHONG CHENG
SJK (C) CHOONG CHENG
SJK (C) CHOONG HWA GURUN
SJK (C) CHUNG HWA JITRA
SJK (C) CHUNG HWA KODIANG
SJK (C) CHUNG HWA SIK
SJK (C) CHUNG HWA POKOK SENA
SJK (C) CHUNG HWA PULAU LANGKAWI
SJK (C) CHUNG HWA BEDONG 
SJK (C) CHUNG HWA YAN
SJK (C) EIK CHOON
SJK (C) FUH SAN
SJK (C) HOON BONG
SJK (C) HUA MIN PADANG SERAI
SJK (C) HWA MIN LUNAS
SJK (C) HWA MIN JITRA
SJK (C) JENIANG
SJK (C) JUNUN
SJK (C) KAMPONG LALANG
SJK (C) KEAT HWA (H)
SJK (C) KEAT HWA (K)
SJK (C) KEAT HWA (S)
SJK (C) KEE CHEE
SJK (C) KELANG LAMA
SJK (C) KHAI MIN
SJK (C) KONG MIN KARANGAN
SJK (C) KONG MIN KUALA KETIL
SJK (C) KOU HUA
SJK (C) KUALA KETIL
SJK (C) KWANG HWA BANDAR BAHRU
SJK (C) KWANG HWA SUNGAI PERAI
SJK (C) LAM MIN
SJK (C) LIN KHAY
SJK (C) LONG CHUAN
SJK (C) LONG SEONG
SJK (C) MAH WAH
SJK (C) MIN NAM
SJK (C) MIN SIN
SJK (C) MIN TERK
SJK (C) NAN KWANG
SJK (C) PEI ENG
SJK (C) PEI HWA GURUN
SJK (C) PEI HWA ALOR SETAR
SJK (C) PEI MIN
SJK (C) PEI SHIH
SJK (C) PEKAN LAMA
SJK (C) PENG MIN KUALA KETIL
SJK (C) PENG MIN ALOR SETAR
SJK (C) PENG MIN SUNGAI PETANI
SJK (C) POAY CHAI
SJK (C) POAY CHAI
SJK (C) POI CHEE
SJK (C) PUMPONG
SJK (C) SENG YOK
SJK (C) SERDANG
SJK (C) SHANG CHENG
SJK (C) SIN HWA
SJK (C) SIN KUO MIN
SJK (C) SIN KWANG
SJK (C) SIN MIN
SJK (C) SIN MIN
SJK (C) SIN MIN (A)
SJK (C) SIN MIN (B)
SJK (C) SIN TEONG
SJK (C) SOON CHENG
SJK (C) SOON JIAN
SJK (C) TAI CHONG
SJK (C) TAI TONG
SJK (C) TONG YUH
SJK (C) YANG KAO
SJK (C) YEANG CHENG
SJK (C) YEOK CHEE
SJK (C) YEOK KHEONG
SJK (C) YIH CHOON
SJK (C) YIH MIN
SJK (C) YIT MIN
SJK (C) YORK KHOON
SJK (C) YUH MIN
SJK (C) YUK MIN

SMJK School
SMJK KEAT HWA 1 ALOR SETAR
SMJK KEAT HWA 2 ALOR SETAR
SMJK SIN MIN SUNGAI PETANI
SMJK CHIO MIN KULIM

Technical school: Sekolah Menengah Teknik (SMT) 
 Sekolah Menengah Teknik Alor Setar (ASTECH) (cluster school)
 SMV Alor Star (Jalan Stadium)
 SMV Kulim
 SMV Langkawi
 SMV Sungai Petani 1
 SMV Sungai Petani 2

Boarding school 
 Maktab Rendah Sains MARA Kubang Pasu
 Maktab Rendah Sains MARA Langkawi
 Maktab Rendah Sains MARA Merbok
 Maktab Rendah Sains MARA PDRM Kulim
 Maktab Rendah Sains MARA Pendang
 Maktab Rendah Sains MARA Baling
 Sekolah Menengah Sains Sultan Mohamad Jiwa (SAINS KEDAH)
 Sekolah Menengah Sains Pokok Sena (SAINA)
 Sekolah Menengah Sultan Abdul Halim (SMSAH)
 Sekolah Berasrama Penuh Integrasi Kubang Pasu (I-KUPA)
 Sekolah Menengah Sains Kubang Pasu (KUPSIS)

Others
 Sekolah Model Khas Baling
 Sekolah Model Khas Bukit Jenun

See also 
 Education in Malaysia

References 
 
 

 
Kedah